Letesenbet Gidey (Tigrinya: ለተሰንበት ግደይ, born 20 March 1998) is an Ethiopian long-distance runner who holds three world records plus one world best. A 10,000 metres 2020 Tokyo Olympic bronze medallist at the World Athletics Championships, she won the silver medal in the event in 2019 and gold in 2022. 

Letesenbet holds the current world records for the 5000 metres, 10,000 metres, and half marathon, which she set in October 2020, June 2021 and October 2021, respectively. She is only the second athlete after Ingrid Kristiansen from 1989–1991 to hold them simultaneously. Her record in the half marathon, making Letesenbet the first debutante to set a world record in the event, broke previous mark by more than a minute. She also holds the world best in the 15 km road race, which was also an over one-minute improvement. Letesenbet became the first woman to break the 64 and 63-minute barriers in the half marathon and the 45-minute barrier in the 15 km. She recorded the fastest women's marathon debut in history at the 2022 Valencia Marathon, placing her sixth on the respective world all-time list.

At age 17, Letesenbet won the junior race at the 2015 World Cross Country Championships. She retained this title in 2017 to take a bronze medal in the senior race in 2019.

Early life and background
Letesenbet Gidey was born in Endameskel in the Tigray Region of Ethiopia. She is the youngest of four siblings, having two brothers and a sister, and grew up on the family's farm.

She was expelled from school as a 13-year-old for refusing to run in physical education classes and was only allowed to return when she agreed to participate. She then won the 2000 m / 3000 m steeplechase double for the Tigray region at the Ethiopian Schools Championships in Shashemane in late 2012.

Career

Junior career

2014
On 14 June, a 16-year-old Letesenbet ran the 5000 metres at the Ethiopian Championships to finish third with a time of 16:19.30. Almaz Ayana won in a time of 16:11.40, and Kidsan Alema was second in 16:13.48.

2015
On 1 February, she won the junior 6 km race at the Jan Meda International Cross Country in Addis Ababa – Ethiopia's trials for the World Cross Country Championships – with a time of 20:30.

On 28 March, she competed in her first international race outside of Ethiopia at the World Cross Country Championships in Guiyang, China, claiming the world under-20 title on a 6.03 km course in a time of 19:48; together with her Ethiopian teammates Letesenbet also took the team title with a clean individual podium sweep. Just eight days after her 17 birthday, she was the youngest junior women's winner for 15 years.

On 21 June, she won the 5000 m run in Bottrop, Germany, in a time of 15:39.83. The runner-up was Jana Groß-Hardt in 17:06.33. At first, Letesenbet was disqualified because she had stepped on a marking on the track, and Groß-Hardt stood at the top of the podium during the award ceremony. Letesenbet objected to this decision, reasoning that her misstep had not given her an unfair advantage, and as a result of her appeal, she was reinstated as the winner.

On 15 July, she ran the 3000 m girls' race at the World U18 Championships in Cali, Colombia, finishing fourth with a time of 9:04.64.

2016
On 22 May, an 18-year-old Letesenbet took victory in the 5000 metres at the FBK Games in Hengelo, Netherlands, in a time of 14:58.44. On 30 June, she won the event at a track meet in Barcelona with a time of 14:45.63, defeating multiple world record holder Genzebe Dibaba who dropped out after 3600 m.

2017
She won the women's junior race at the Ethiopian Cross Country championships on 13 February in Addis Ababa.

On 26 March, she defended her junior title on a 6 km course at the World Cross Country Championship in Kampala, Uganda.

The then 19-year-old competed in the 5000 m event at the World Championships in London. She advanced to the finals and finished 11th of 14 starters, stopping the clock at 15:04.99. The race was won by Hellen Obiri in a time of 14:34.86, the silver medal went to Almaz Ayana, who ran 14:40.35, and Sifan Hassan was third in 14:42.74.

Senior career

2018
In February, Letesenbet won the 6 km race at the sixth leg of the IAAF Cross Country Permit series taking place in San Vittore Olona, Italy. Her winning time was 18:14. On 26 May, she ran the 5000 m at the Prefontaine Classic in Eugene, U.S. and placed second in a time of 14:30.29, beating Obiri in third in 14:35.03; Genzebe Dibaba won the race in 14:26.89.

2019: 10,000 m World silver medallist
On 10 February, Letesenbet competed in the 10 km run at the Jan Meda Cross Country Championships in Addis Ababa, finishing second with a time of 35:55. The winner of the event was Dera Dida in 35:50.

At the World Cross Country Championships in Aarhus, Denmark, she participated in the senior race. The world 5000 m champion Hellen Obiri took the title on the extremely hilly 10.2 km course with a time of 36:14, Dida was the runner-up in 36:16, and Letesenbet earned the bronze medal by clocking 36:24.

She raced the 10,000 m at the Ethiopian Championships in Addis Ababa on 8 May, winning in a time of 32:10.2. On 19 May, Letesenbet ran the 10 km road race in Bengaluru, India. She placed second, with Agnes Tirop the winner and Senbere Teferi in third place. All three women finished at the same time at 33:55. At the Diamond League Prefontaine Classic meet in Stanford, California on 30 June, she took third place in the 3000 m race with a time of 8:20.27, a new African outdoor best. The winner was Sifan Hassan in 8:18.49, a European record, and Konstanze Klosterhalfen was second in 8:20.07. Seven of the top 15 runners ran personal bests. On 17 July, Letesenbet won the 10,000 m Ethiopian trials on the track in Hengelo, Netherlands in a time of 30:37.89.

At the Diamond League final in Brussels, Letesenbet finished second in the 5000 m with a time of 14:29.54. Hassan won the race in 14:26.26.

On 28 September, Letesenbet took the silver medal in the 10,000 m at the World Championships held in Doha, Qatar, with a personal best of 30:21.23. Hassan won the race in a time of 30:17.33, a new Dutch national record, with Agnes Tirop third in 30:25.50.

15K run World record
On 17 November 2019, Letesenbet set a new world record of 44m 20s in the 15 km road race at the Zevenheuvelenloop road race in Nijmegen, Netherlands, breaking the 2017 world record held by Joyciline Jepkosgei by one minute and 17 seconds, and becoming the first woman to run 15K under 45 minutes. Letesenbet ran the final 10K in 29:12, the fastest time ever recorded by a woman under any conditions (Almaz Ayana's track world record for 10,000 m was at the time at 29:17.45). Her average pace through 15K was 2:57 per kilometre. She lowered by more than 2 minutes Tirunesh Dibaba's 2009 world record set also at the Zevenheuvelenloop in 46:28, which was, in turn, a 27-second improvement on the former mark at the time. She received a prize of 50,000 euros for her world record.

2020
At the Monaco Diamond League meet on 14 August, Letesenbet was defeated in the 5000 m race by Hellen Obiri, who set a meeting record, 14:26.57 to 14:22.12.

5000 metres World record
On 7 October 2020, at the NN Valencia World Record Day meet, the 22-year-old broke Tirunesh Dibaba's 2008 record in the 5000 m taking more than 4 seconds off to stop the clock at 14m 6.62s.

2021: 10,000 m Tokyo Olympic bronze medallist

10,000 metres World record
On 6 June, Sifan Hassan set a 10,000 m world record of 29:06.82. Just two days later, on 8 June, Letesenbet broke Hassan's record at the Ethiopian trials on the same track by more than four seconds with a time of 29m 1.03s, running the last lap in one minute and three seconds. She was slightly behind the world record pace at the halfway point but began to accelerate after 7000 m. Her time for the second half of the race of 14:18 was the eighth-quickest women’s 5000 m time ever run. She became the first woman to hold both the 5000 m and 10,000 m world records since Ingrid Kristiansen from 1986–1993.

Racing in the event at the delayed 2020 Tokyo Olympics in August, Letesenbet took the bronze medal, however. After the tactical race, she led on the final bend but was then outsprinted by both Hassan (29:55.32) and Bahrain's Kalkidan Gezahegne (29:56.18) to finish third in 30:01.72.

Half marathon World record
On 24 October 2021, on her half marathon debut, Letesenbet finished in 62m 52s at the Valencia Half Marathon, becoming the first woman to run under 64 minutes (legally) and under 63 minutes, and improving upon previous Ruth Chepng'etich's world record by 70 seconds (52 s upon an unratified mark of Yalemzerf Yehualaw). She reached 10K in 29:45 – the third-fastest clocking in history and just seven seconds off the world record for the distance, and her 15K time was only nine seconds slower than her own world best. Letesenbet's 70-second improvement of the world record was the biggest drop in the women’s half marathon since 1978.

2022: 10,000 m World champion

Letesenbet claimed her first senior global title and her first global track title at the World Championships in Eugene, Oregon, in July. She held off a twin Kenyan challenge in a nail-biting finish (the top 3 were only separated by 0.13 s) to win the 10,000 metres gold, achieving a world-leading time of 30:09.94 ahead of Hellen Obiri in 30:10.02 and Margaret Kipkemboi in 30:10.07. Seven days later, she also competed in the 5000 m event and finished fifth.

On her highly anticipated marathon debut at the Valencia Marathon in December, the 24-year-old was initially executing her negative split tactic and gradually accelerated to put herself on world record (2:14:04) pace at 33 km, but eventually faded over the final 7 km quite a bit. She finished second behind Amane Beriso with a time of 2:16:49, setting, however, a record for the fastest ever at the time women's marathon debut and placing sixth on the world all-time list.

2023
Letesenbet started the year with a win at the Jan Meda Cross Country held in Sululta on 1 January, which doubled as Ethiopia’s trial race for the February's World Cross Country Championships in Australia. At the event, she led but faded in the home straight to be overtaken by Beatrice Chebet just metres before the finish line. Letesenbet then stumbled and collapsed, and was eventually disqualified after requiring assistance.

Achievements
All information from World Athletics profile.

Personal bests

International competitions

National championships
 Ethiopian Athletics Championships
 10,000 metres: 2019

Notes

References

External links

 

1998 births
Living people
Ethiopian female long-distance runners
World Athletics Championships athletes for Ethiopia
World Athletics Championships medalists
World Athletics record holders
Ethiopian Athletics Championships winners
Athletes (track and field) at the 2020 Summer Olympics
Olympic athletes of Ethiopia
Medalists at the 2020 Summer Olympics
Olympic bronze medalists in athletics (track and field)
Olympic bronze medalists for Ethiopia
20th-century Ethiopian women
21st-century Ethiopian women